Endometrial ablation is a surgical procedure that is used to remove (ablate) or destroy the endometrial lining of the uterus. The goal of the procedure is to decrease the amount of blood loss during menstrual periods. Endometrial ablation is most often employed in people with excessive menstrual bleeding, who do not wish to undergo a hysterectomy, following unsuccessful medical therapy.

Endometrial ablation is typically done in a minimally invasive manner with no external incisions. Slender tools are inserted through the vagina and into the uterus. In some forms of the procedure, one of these tools may be a camera (hysteroscope) to assist with visualization. Other tools include those that harness electricity, high-energy radio waves, heated fluids, or cold temperature to destroy the endometrial lining.

The procedure is almost always performed as an outpatient treatment, either at a hospital, ambulatory surgery center, or physician office. Patients will most commonly undergo local and/or light sedative anesthesia, or if necessary, general or spinal anesthesia.

After the procedure, the endometrium heals by scarring over, thus reducing or eliminating future uterine bleeding. The patient's hormonal functions will remain unaffected because the ovaries are left intact. Due to the uterine changes that take place after undergoing ablation, patients are unlikely to be able to become pregnant after the procedure, and of pregnancies that do occur, complication risk is high. To reduce the associated mortality risks, it is often recommended for patients to adhere to birth control methods after undergoing endometrial ablation.

Indications 
The primary indication for endometrial ablation is abnormal uterine bleeding, including chronic heavy menstrual bleeding, in premenopausal patients. Typically, these are patients for whom first-line medical therapy was unsuccessful or contraindicated.

Absolute contraindications for undergoing endometrial ablation include endometrial carcinoma, current pregnancy, and desire for future pregnancy.

Preparation and Planning 
Prior to undergoing endometrial ablation, patients will go through a pre-procedure evaluation and risk assessment. Components of this often include informed consent, anesthesia evaluation, and a pregnancy test (as current pregnancy is a contraindication to the procedure). All patients will undergo endometrial sampling to test for endometrial carcinoma, as this is an absolute contraindication to endometrial ablation. Some patients may also require further assessment of the uterus through hysteroscopy or saline infusion sonohysterography), and/or removal of any current IUD.

Depending on the treatment that is chosen, endometrial ablation is sometimes conducted after treatment with hormones, such as norethisterone or Lupron to reduce the thickness of the endometrium.

Procedure 
Endometrial ablation may be done in-office or in an operating room. The procedure begins with cervical dilation, which temporarily stretches the cervix to make room for the ablation instruments and/or hysteroscope to enter the uterus. Dilation can be induced medically with pharmacologic agents, or mechanically with a series of metal tools of increasing diameter. After sufficient dilation, the ablation instrument is introduced into the uterine cavity, which is used to partially or fully destroy the endometrial lining. A hysteroscope may be used to assist in visualization of this process and/or ensure that final results are adequate.

The technique utilized to remove or destroy the endometrium varies with endometrial ablation operations. Options consist of:

 Ablation with cryotherapy- The uterus is probed with a chilled probe. The uterine lining is destroyed when the extreme cold at the probe's tip freezes it in pieces. Your doctor can monitor the development thanks to ultrasound. It takes roughly six minutes to complete one freezing cycle. The size and shape of the uterus will determine how many cycles are required.
 Water-thermal ablation- For roughly 10 minutes, warm fluid is delivered into the uterus. The uterine lining is destroyed by the heat. This technique has the benefit of being usable in patients who have uteri that are shaped differently due to abnormal tissue growth. Lesions inside the uterus or uterine fibroids are two conditions that can lead to the uterus becoming misshapen.
 Ablation with Radiofrequency- A flexible, triangular device inside the uterus is opened using a specialized tool. The uterine lining is destroyed by radiofrequency energy released by the ablation device in 1 to 2 minutes. After that, the device is taken out of the uterus.
 Ablation using Electrocautery- The uterus is visualized using a thin scope. A tool is passed through the scope, such as a wire loop, a probe with a rollerball tip, or a probe with an electrode tip. The uterine lining is removed or destroyed by the device using electric current. General anesthesia is required for electrocautery  ablation. Less frequently than other techniques, this ablation technique is employed.
 Radiofrequency Ablation- The uterus is filled with a device. The uterine lining is destroyed by the device's use of microwave energy.

After the ablation procedure is complete, any concomitant procedures that patients have opted for will also be completed. A common procedure after endometrial ablation is IUD insertion, as effective contraception following endometrial ablation is highly recommended. Other concomitant procedures may include myomectomy and/or tubal ligation.

Endometrial ablation is often an outpatient procedure that does not require an overnight hospital stay. Patients may experience cramping, vaginal discharge, and/or urinary changes during the recovery process.

Technique 

A number of treatment options are available, all of which work by inserting tools into the cervix to destroy the ablate the endometrium. Commonly used ablation systems include:

 The NovaSure – Endometrial Ablation System, FDA approved in 2001, utilizes a metallized mesh electrode array that is introduced into the uterine cavity, applying bipolar electrical energy that creates heat to ablate the endometrium. The Novasure average procedure time is 5 minutes from device insertion to removal and is usually performed under local and/or conscious sedation anesthesia. Most patients leave the treatment center within one hour of treatment. In the Novasure randomized controlled trial for FDA approval, the success rate (i.e. bleeding reduced to a normal or less level) was 78% and amenorrhea rate (i.e. bleeding eliminated) was 36%.
 The Minerva – Endometrial Ablation System, FDA approved in July 2015, is the first new FDA-approved surgical treatment for heavy menstrual bleeding in over 15 years. Minerva works by generating heat from plasma energy that is created and contained inside a leak-proof ablation array that takes the shape of the uterine cavity. The hot membrane surface of the array ablates the endometrium. The Minerva procedure is the fastest FDA approved treatment, average procedure time is 3.1 minutes from device insertion to removal, and is usually performed under local and/or conscious sedation anesthesia. Most patients leave the treatment center within one hour of treatment. In the Minerva randomized controlled trial for FDA approval, the success rate was 93% and amenorrhea rate was 72%.
 The Genesys HTA – Hydro-Thermal Ablation System, FDA approved in 2001, uses a hysteroscope device which is inserted into the uterus through the cervical canal, to help doctors safely confirm proper probe placement and to see the area they are treating. In this procedure, the doctor looks at the inside of the uterus with the hysteroscope and then fills the uterus with saline fluid. The fluid is then slowly heated and the lining of the uterus is burned so that menstrual bleeding periods become less heavy and, in some cases, even stops. The fluid is then cooled and removed by special tubing to protect the external areas of the body from any burns. The average procedure time is 26 minutes. In the HTA randomized controlled trial for FDA approval, the success rate was 68% and amenorrhea rate was 35%.
 The Her Option – Endometrial Ablation System, FDA approved in 2001, is a treatment that creates sub-zero temperatures to freeze and ablate the endometrium. Following the application of local anesthetic around the cervix, a physician uses ultrasound to guide the placement of a cryoprobe to the right uterine horn. The cryoprobe is activated, reducing its temperature to minus 60 °C. The cryoprobe is kept in place while ice is formed in the uterine cavity, under ultrasound observation. Once the appropriate time has passed or the appropriate depth of ice has been achieved, the cryoprobe is warmed to 37 °C. The cryoprobe is then repositioned to the untreated left uterine horn and the procedure is repeated. Finally, the cryoprobe is warmed and removed. In the Her Option randomized controlled trial for FDA approval, the success rate was 67% and amenorrhea rate was 22%.
 Transcervical Resection of the Endometrium (TCRE), commonly called Loop Resection with Rollerball Ablation, utilizes a hysteroscope through which a bi-polar radio frequency electrocautery cutting loop is deployed to resect, or remove, the superficial endometrium. This is followed by a bi-polar radio frequency rollerball tool to ablate the remaining underlying endometrium via cauterization. It is a proven procedure, being an outpatient procedure with rapid recovery.
 The Thermachoice III balloon, FDA approved in 1997, was taken off the market in December 2015. This system utilized a heated saline filled balloon which was inserted into the uterine cavity to ablate the endometrium. The fluid was safely contained in a flexible and non-allergenic Silastic membrane that conformed to most uterine cavity shapes and sizes.

Older methods utilize hysteroscopy to insert instruments into the uterus to destroy the lining under visualization using a laser, or microwave probe.

Effectiveness 
The U.S. Food and Drug Administration approves and audits clinical studies to test and evaluate the effectiveness of all endometrial ablation treatments. Two patient effectiveness outcomes are measured at one year following treatment: 1) success rate = the % of people who have their bleeding reduced to a normal period level or less, and 2) amenorrhea rate = the % of people that have their bleeding eliminated.  According to the results of the Randomized Controlled Trials performed for the FDA approval of the different treatment options, effectiveness Success Rates range from a high of 93% to a low of 67%, and the Amenorrhea Rates range from a high of 72% to a low of 22%.

Complications 
Although rare, the procedure can have complications including:

 Infection
 Hemorrhage
 Damage to the uterus (beyond the endometrial lining)
 Perforation of the uterus
 Hematometra
 Sterilization and/or difficulty conceiving
 Post-ablation tubal sterilization syndrome

See also
Hysteroscopy
Heavy menstrual bleeding
Hysterectomy
Endometrium
Asherman's syndrome

References

Gynecological surgery